The discography of American pop punk band Plain White T's consists of eight studio albums, three extended plays, fourteen singles and eighteen music videos.

Studio albums

Extended plays

Singles

Other appearances

Music videos
"Stop" (2002)
"Please Don't Do This" (2002)
"Take Me Away" (2005)
"Hey There Delilah" (2006)
"Hate (I Really Don't Like You)" (2006)
"Our Time Now" (2006)
"Making a Memory" (2007)
"Figure It Out" (2007)
"Natural Disaster" (2008)
"1,2,3,4" (two versions) (2008)
"Sunlight" (2009)
"Rhythm of Love" (2010)
"Boomerang" (2011)
"Pet Sematary" (Ramones cover) (2012)
"Should've Gone to Bed" (2013)
 "The Giving Tree" (two versions, 2013)
 “Land of the Living” (2017)

Compilation appearances
"Bruises", from Oil: Chicago Punk Refined
"Song 2" (Blur cover), on the album Punk Goes '90s
"Season of a Lifetime", on the album Taste of Christmas
"It's So Easy", on the album Sound of Superman
"Better Luck Next Time", on the album Dead Bands Party: A Tribute to Oingo Boingo
"When I See an Elephant Fly", on the album DisneyMania 6
"Miss Kneel", on the album Elmhurst vs. Villa Park
"Cell Phone Number" and "Move On" on the album Songs from a Scene
"Poor Jack", on the album Nightmare Revisited (2008)
"Natural Disaster", on the DVD Take Action: Volume 8
"Welcome to Mystery" on the album Almost Alice (2010)
"Pet Sematary" on the album Frankenweenie Unleashed! (2012)

Notes

References

Discographies of American artists